Matthew Anthony Derbyshire (born 14 April 1986) is an English professional footballer who plays as a  striker for  club Bradford City.

He played for Blackburn Rovers for five years, and had loan spells with Plymouth Argyle, Wrexham and Olympiacos, before joining the latter club on a permanent basis in 2009. He played for Birmingham City on loan for the 2010–11 season, and continued with spells at Nottingham Forest, Oldham Athletic, Blackpool and Rotherham United. He spent four seasons in Cypriot football with Omonia followed by one season with A-League club Macarthur FC before returning to Cyprus with AEK Larnaca. He joined NorthEast United in 2022.

He won 14 caps for England at under-21 level.

Club career

Early life and career
Derbyshire was born in Great Harwood, Lancashire and attended Our Lady and St John R.C. High School in Blackburn. He played football as a youngster for Darwen before joining Great Harwood Town in 2002. He scored his first goal for the club's first team as a 16-year-old, in October 2002, and by the time he left in November 2003, he had scored 26, of which 21 had come in the North West Counties League, and 18 in his last nine appearances.

Blackburn Rovers
Derbyshire joined Blackburn Rovers in November 2003 for a £20,000 fee, a club record for Great Harwood. He had previously worked in Rovers' community department, coaching young children. He rejected a move to Manchester United in favour of Blackburn, whom he had supported since he was a child. He progressed through the youth and reserve teams, and his performances earned him the Supporters' Young Player of the Year award for the 2004–05 season. Derbyshire made his first-team debut as a late substitute in the Premiership defeat at home to Fulham on 7 May 2005.

He joined Championship club Plymouth Argyle on 30 August 2005 on loan for the season; a few days later, manager Bobby Williamson was sacked. Derbyshire made his debut as a substitute in caretaker Jocky Scott's first match in charge, and started the next three, after which Tony Pulis was appointed manager and Derbyshire made nine more appearances but no more starts. The loan was ended early, and on the advice of Blackburn manager Mark Hughes, he began another loan, an initial month at League Two club Wrexham. He scored five goals in as many games, the loan was extended to three months, and he ended up with ten goals from 16 league matches and a new two-year contract with Blackburn.

Derbyshire opened his senior goal account for Blackburn in a 3–0 win against Wigan Athletic on 1 January 2007 before extending his tally further with the opener away to Everton in a 4–1 FA Cup third-round victory six days later. He made his first Premiership start against Arsenal on 13 January, and scored his third goal in four games against Manchester City. His form continued the following week with two goals and an assist away to Luton Town in the FA Cup fourth round. He also scored against Manchester United, taking advantage of a defensive error to give Blackburn Rovers a 1–0 lead, although they went on to lose the match 4–1. He finished his first Premier League season with 9 goals in all competitions, from 14 starts and 16 substitute appearances.

In the 2007–08 season, Derbyshire scored in the first match of the season, against Middlesbrough, coming on as a substitute to score the winner in a 2–1 victory. On 1 March 2008, he scored a 90th-minute winner against Newcastle United, and again scored a late winner, against Fulham on 20 September, finishing off a move involving Tugay, Carlos Villanueva and Roque Santa Cruz.

Olympiacos
He found starts hard to come by under new manager Paul Ince and played little after the arrival of his successor Sam Allardyce, and in late January 2009, Derbyshire joined Olympiacos on loan until the end of the 2008–09 Superleague season. He made his first appearance for the club as a substitute in the first leg of a Greek Cup match at PAOK's Toumba Stadium. In the return match, his home debut, Derbyshire scored a goal in extra time, securing progress to the semi-finals.

He made his league debut on 14 February in a 2–1 home victory over Aris as an 79th-minute substitute for Diogo. On 15 March, he scored his first goal in a 5–0 win over Iraklis with his first touch of the ball after coming on for Luciano Galletti in the 81st minute, adding his second goal (and Olympiacos' fifth) just five minutes later. The following week he started the match against Panionios and played the whole 90 minutes, scoring in a 2–3 away win.

Derbyshire played a pivotal role in the Greek Cup final against cross-city rivals AEK Athens. With Olympiacos 2–0 down, he was brought on at half-time; three minutes later, he scored. The game then went to 2–2 before AEK Athens scored what seemed to be the winning goal in stoppage time. However, with the last touch of the game, Derbyshire headed an equaliser in the sixth minute of added time, bringing the score to 3–3, after having suffered a broken nose and suspected concussion following a clash with an opponent. He stated afterwards that he realised he had scored from the cheers of fans. Olympiacos went on to win the match 15–14 on penalties, and Derbyshire received the Man of the match award for his efforts. He signed a four-year contract with Olympiacos on 23 June 2009 after the clubs agreed a fee reported as £3m.

On 21 March 2010, Derbyshire scored the winning goal against Panathinaikos, in a 1–0 away victory, and was instantly nicknamed The English Killer by the Greek media.

In August 2010, the team's new coach, Ernesto Valverde, told Derbyshire that he was not part of his plans for the 2010–11 season, so he should search for a new team.

Birmingham loan
Derbyshire returned to England when he signed for Birmingham City on 16 August 2010 on loan for the 2010–11 Premier League season, with a possibility of the deal being made permanent at the end of that time. He made his debut against former club Blackburn Rovers on 21 August as a second-half substitute for fellow new signing Nikola Žigić, and scored his first goal for the club five days later in a 3–2 League Cup victory over Rochdale. After waiting until January 2011 for his first Premier League start for Birmingham, against Blackpool, he then scored twice in the 4–1 win at Millwall in the third round of the FA Cup. Derbyshire never established himself in the first team, and despite making five appearances in that season's League Cup competition, he was omitted from Birmingham's squad for the final, in which Birmingham achieved a shock 2–1 victory against Arsenal. He left the club at the end of the season after their relegation from the Premier League.

Nottingham Forest
Derbyshire signed a three-year contract with Championship club Nottingham Forest on 10 August 2011. The fee was undisclosed. He was issued squad number eight. Upon signing, Derbyshire stated the importance to his career of getting regular first team football again. At Forest Derbyshire renewed acquaintance with assistant manager Rob Kelly, who was his coach when he was a youth player at Blackburn Rovers. Derbyshire made his debut for Forest on 16 August in a 1–0 away win against Doncaster Rovers. His first and only goal in the 2011–12 season was the opener in a 3–2 away defeat to Southampton.

On 14 September 2012 Derbyshire went on loan to League One club Oldham Athletic in a short-term deal. He scored on his debut a day later, scoring in a 2–2 draw at home to Notts County. He scored again in the following game, earning a point for Oldham in a 1–1 draw against Scunthorpe United. Derbyshire's third goal for Oldham came in a 2–0 away win over Crewe Alexandra. He scored again in a 2–0 win at home to Leyton Orient, but the goal was controversial as Orient manager Russell Slade accused Derbyshire of a "blatant" handball offence that the referee did not see. Manager Paul Dickov then stated his desire to keep him at the club, and the spell was extended until 15 December.

In January 2012 Derbyshire went on loan to Championship club Blackpool but failed to score for them.

Rotherham United
Derbyshire signed for newly promoted Championship team Rotherham United on a two-year contract on 30 May 2014. Before his departure in summer 2016 he scored 17 goals in 69 matches for the club.

Omonia Nicosia
On 17 June 2016, Cypriot First Division club Omonia Nicosia announced the signing of Derbyshire. He made his debut on 30 June against FC Banants Yerevan in the first leg of the Europa League first qualifying round, and scored the only goal of the match. In his first league appearance, in a 3–1 win against Ermis Aradippou, Derbyshire opened the scoring with a second-minute penalty. On 4 January 2017 he drew attention when he scored a hat-trick against Ethnikos Achna in 4 minutes, overturning a 2–0 deficit against Omonia, that gave his side a valuable league victory. He continued to score regularly, and finished the season as the league's top scorer with 24 goals, three more than his nearest rival.

On 9 August 2017, Omonia announced the extension of his contract until the summer of 2021.

In th first game of the 2017-18 season, on 10 September 2017, he scored both goals for Omonia against Ethnikos Achna. He scored 23 goals from 33 appearances over the season, which made him again the league's top scorer.

In the 2018–19 season Derbyshire made 25 league appearances but scored only twice.

On the opening day of the 2019—20 season, Derbyshire opened the scoring against Doxa Katokopias with a header.

Macarthur FC
On 4 August 2020, it was announced that Derbyshire had signed for new Australian A-League club Macarthur FC on a two-year contract.

AEK Larnaca 
On 10 July 2021, Macarthur FC confirmed that they had agreed an undisclosed fee for Derbyshire's transfer to Cypriot top-flight club AEK Larnaca. The move was reported elsewhere as a free transfer.

NorthEast United 
Derbyshire signed for NorthEast United of the Indian Super League on 2 September 2022.

Bradford City
On 30 December 2022 it was announced that Derbyshire would sign for Bradford City on 9 January 2023.

International career
Derbyshire was called up to the England Under-21 squad by new manager Stuart Pearce for a friendly against Spain on 6 February, but was forced to withdraw after he tore a thigh muscle playing for Blackburn three days before the match.

However, Derbyshire was fit enough to be included in the under-21 squad to face Italy in the opening fixture of the new Wembley Stadium on 24 March; he scored England's third goal in a thrilling 3–3 draw. During the group stage of the 2007 European Under-21 Football Championship, he was the scorer of a controversial goal against the Serbian under-21 team. He did not kick the ball out when Serbian defender Slobodan Rajković was down injured and went on to score England's second goal of the game; in his defence, Derbyshire claimed he did not see the injured player. He took part in the epic semi-final shootout against hosts Netherlands, scoring his first but having his second penalty saved as England lost 13–12. On 27 March 2009, Derbyshire played the second half for England as they beat Norway 5–0, scoring two goals.

Personal life
Derbyshire's wife Melissa, née Norman, is from Ireland and they have three boys, twins Braidín and Callum and the youngest Killian.

Career statistics

Honours
Olympiacos
Super League Greece: 2008–09
Greek Cup: 2008–09

Birmingham City
League Cup: 2010–11

Individual
2009 Greek Cup Final Man of the Match 
Cypriot First Division top goalscorer: 2016–17, 2017–18
A-League PFA Team of the Season: 2020–21

References

External links

Matt Derbyshire profile at the Rotherham United F.C. website

1986 births
Living people
People from Great Harwood
Sportspeople from Lancashire
English footballers
England under-21 international footballers
Association football forwards
Great Harwood Town F.C. players
Blackburn Rovers F.C. players
Wrexham A.F.C. players
Plymouth Argyle F.C. players
Olympiacos F.C. players
Birmingham City F.C. players
Nottingham Forest F.C. players
Oldham Athletic A.F.C. players
Blackpool F.C. players
Rotherham United F.C. players
AC Omonia players
Macarthur FC players
NorthEast United FC players
Premier League players
English Football League players
Super League Greece players
Cypriot First Division players
A-League Men players
Indian Super League players
Association football coaches
Blackburn Rovers F.C. non-playing staff
English expatriate footballers
Expatriate footballers in Greece
Expatriate footballers in Cyprus
Expatriate soccer players in Australia
Expatriate footballers in India
English expatriate sportspeople in Greece
English expatriate sportspeople in Cyprus
English expatriate sportspeople in Australia
English expatriate sportspeople in India
Bradford City A.F.C. players